Chu Kwok Kuen is a former football player for the Hong Kong national football team. He is the head coach of Citizen AA in the Hong Kong First Division.

Chu was the Goalkeeper coach of the Hong Kong national football team, Hong Kong 08 and the youth teams from 2000 to 2010.

He holds an AFC Grade A Coach licence.

References

Hong Kong footballers
Citizen AA managers
Hong Kong international footballers
Living people
Hong Kong First Division League players
Seiko SA players
Association football goalkeepers
Hong Kong football managers
Year of birth missing (living people)